Wanguri is a northern suburb of the city of Darwin, Northern Territory, Australia.

History
Wanguri was one of Darwin's northern suburbs built before Cyclone Tracy in 1974. It derives its name from the Aboriginal Tribe. The streets in Wanguri are mostly named after early Greek residents of Darwin.

Present day
Major features of Wanguri include the Wanguri Primary School and Wanguri Park. Wanguri experienced a decrease in population between 1996 and 2001.

Wanguri is part of the Wanguri electoral division which also includes Leanyer, Muirhead and parts of Lyons.

References

External links

 NT Government placenames
 City of Darwin Community Profiles

Suburbs of Darwin, Northern Territory